The Hourglass Anthology is a compilation album by American heavy metal band Lamb of God, released in three discs in 2010. The first disc is "Volume One: The Underground Years", which contains their best songs from when they were called "Burn the Priest", and songs from New American Gospel and As the Palaces Burn. The second disc is "Volume Two: The Epic Years", which contains songs from the albums Ashes of the Wake, Sacrament and Wrath. The third form was a box set with volume 1 and 2 and contains a third volume, "Volume 3: The Vault". This volume contains previously rare unreleased recordings.

Track listing

Personnel
Lamb of God
Randy Blythe - vocals
Mark Morton - guitar
Willie Adler - guitar
John Campbell - bass
Chris Adler - drums, percussion

References

Lamb of God (band) albums
Epic Records albums
2010 compilation albums